Xanthostemon chrysanthus, the golden penda or first love, is a species of tree in the myrtle family Myrtaceae, endemic to (found only in) north eastern Queensland, Australia. It is a popular garden plant with showy yellow blooms.

Taxonomy
It was first described in 1864 by Victorian Government Botanist Ferdinand von Mueller as Metrosideros chrysantha, after being collected by John Dallachy on 12 April 1864 from Rockingham Bay in northern Queensland. It was reclassified in the genus Xanthostemon by George Bentham in the third volume of his Flora Australiensis in 1867. The species name is derived from the Ancient Greek words chrysos "golden", and "anthos" "flower".

Description
The bark is rough and the habit bushy. The shiny green elliptic leaves measure 7–22 cm long by 2–9.5 cm wide. They are arranged in whorls along the stems.

They are made up of numerous small (1–2 cm diameter) individual golden flowers. Flowering is followed by small (1-1,5 cm) green or brown woody capsules which are ripe between August and February. Flowers can appear at any time of year.

Distribution and habitat
The range is from Cardwell northwards into Cape York Peninsula in Far North Queensland. It grows in open forest or rainforest, often along the banks of creeks and rivers.

Cultivation

Xanthostemon chrysanthus is cultivated as an ornamental plant for use in gardens and park landscaping. Its horticultural appeal stems from its profuse and attractive flowering. It can be propagated by seed or cuttings. It grows well in subtropical gardens with fair drainage and sunny aspect.  The species is less reliable in flowering in climates such as Sydney.

Expo gold
The golden penda tree was selected as the theme plant for Expo 88. Cuttings of the tree, which is native to north Queensland, were taken from a superior form from a garden in Brisbane and planted in flower in Brisbane to create a 'Sea of Gold'. In late autumn, the tree can still be seen in flower in gardens and lining streets across Brisbane.  

The tree is also the native floral emblem of Cairns.

References

chrysanthus
Myrtales of Australia
Flora of Queensland
Endemic flora of Australia
Garden plants of Australia
Ornamental trees
Taxa named by Ferdinand von Mueller